Rudolf Schmidt  (12 May 1886 – 7 April 1957) was a general in the Wehrmacht of Nazi Germany during World War II who commanded the 2nd Panzer Army on the Eastern Front. He was a recipient of the Knight's Cross of the Iron Cross with Oak Leaves.

Career
Schmidt  joined the Prussian Army in 1906 and served during World War I. He was retained in the Reichswehr where he served in staff roles. In October 1936 he was promoted to Generalmajor and appointed commander of the 1st Panzer Division. In 1939 Schmidt led the division in the invasion of Poland.

On 1 February 1940 he was appointed commanding general of the XXXIX Panzer Corps. He led the Corps in France and was awarded the Knight's Cross of the Iron Cross for his role in that campaign on 3 June 1940. He was promoted to General der Panzertruppe and appointed acting commander of the 2nd Army which took part in the Battle of Moscow. On 25 December 1941 he was appointed Commander of the 2nd Panzer Army (replacing the sacked General Guderian).

His brother Hans-Thilo Schmidt sold details of the Germans' Enigma machine and other sensitive military information to the French Deuxième Bureau from 1931 until the German invasion of France in 1940. In January 1942 Rudolf Schmidt was promoted to Generaloberst, but on 10 April 1943 he was relieved of his command after the Gestapo arrested his brother for spying for the French, and found letters that Schmidt had written in which he was highly critical of Hitler’s conduct of the war and the Nazi Party. He appeared before a court martial but was acquitted and transferred to the leadership reserve on 30 September 1943. He was never re-employed.

On 16 December 1947 Schmidt was arrested by Soviet forces on his way to his home in Weimar. Taken to Moscow, he was initially imprisoned at the Vladimir Central Prison and Butyrka prison. In 1952, he was sentenced to 25 years by a military tribunal. On 30 September 1955, Schmidt was among the last prisoners to be released. He died in 1957.

Awards

 Iron Cross (1939) 2nd Class (22 September 1939) & 1st Class (2 October 1939)
 Knight's Cross of the Iron Cross with Oak Leaves
 Knight's Cross on 3 June 1940 as Generalleutnant and commanding general of the XXXIX. Armeekorps (mot.)
 19th Oak Leaves on 10 July 1941 as General der Panzertruppe and commanding general of the XXXIX. Armeekorps (mot.)

References

Citations

Bibliography

 
 

1886 births
1957 deaths
Military personnel from Berlin
German Army officers of World War II
Colonel generals of the German Army (Wehrmacht)
German Army personnel of World War I
Prussian Army personnel
Recipients of the clasp to the Iron Cross, 1st class
Recipients of the Knight's Cross of the Iron Cross with Oak Leaves
German prisoners of war in World War II held by the Soviet Union
People from the Province of Brandenburg
Reichswehr personnel